Myanmar has made only one appearance at the AFC Asian Cup as Burma, during the 1968 AFC Asian Cup in which they finished as runner-up.

During 1950s to 1970s, Burma was one of Asia's football powerhouses and they had been considered as a tough contender for the title in Asian Cup. Burma, however only qualified for one Asian Cup, in 1968. Since then, due to internal struggles, conflicts and economic downturn, Burma had failed to manage success and was unable to qualify for the Asian Cup. As for 2019, this remains as their only appearance.

Iran 1968

Asian Cup record

References 

Countries at the AFC Asian Cup